The Alliance was a short-lived French automobile manufactured in Paris from 1905 to 1908.  Also known as the Aiglon, the marque had a similar radiator to that used on the Mass.  The company listed an 18hp four with Tony Huber engine in 1908; this car sold in England for £450.

Brass Era vehicles
Defunct motor vehicle manufacturers of France